Heiltz-le-Maurupt is a commune in the Marne department in north-eastern France.

Geography
The village lies on the right bank of the Chée, which flows westward through the middle of the commune.

The Ornain forms most of the commune's southern border.

See also
Communes of the Marne department

References

Heiltzlemaurupt